Creatures of Influence is an independent album by the synthpop band Information Society. The album was temporarily made available for free listening on the band's website; it was removed in preparation for the re-release in the Apocryphon compilation.

Track listing
All songs composed by Paul Robb, except track 2 by Murat Konar.
 "Hiroshima" – 4:45
 "Running" – 8:03
 "Creatures of Influence" – 3:42
 "Don't Lose Your Mind" – 4:21
 "Fall in Line" – 3:48
 "Signals" – 4:12
 "The Swamp" – 3:03

Personnel
 Paul Robb
 Murat Konar
 Kurt Harland
 James Cassidy

External links
 Kurt Harland comments on Creatures Of Influence
 Video of "Fall in Line"

1984 albums
Information Society (band) albums